Martins Ferry may refer to:
Martins Ferry, California
Martins Ferry, Ohio